Saadat Khiyali  was a senior Pakistani journalist, columnist, and committed trade union leader. He was Executive Editor of Daily Mashriq Lahore. He was also known for his columns in Urdu newspapers. He worked under Shaukat Butt who was Vice President of the Union of Journalists Rawalpindi from 1970–74. His son, Zulfiqar, is currently living in Mississauga.

Career 
Khiyali  broke  the  news  of  SIX  Points  of  Mujib ur Rheman  in  Kohistan.  Ghulam  Akbar,  Chief  Editor  of  Al Akhbar, was then the Executive Editor of Kohistan. Enayat  Ullah   recruited  Sadat  Khayali  in  Kohistan for his reporting.

Death 
Saadat Khiyali died on 2 March 2011.

References

External links 
 http://groups.google.com/group/PressPakistan/browse_thread/thread/0c5f9a99a3613c0c/d1f616ca84dab187?#d1f616ca84dab187
 https://web.archive.org/web/20110928102203/http://www.bahoo.org/Search.asp?cid=1926&Sno=1

Pakistani male journalists
Journalists from Lahore
2011 deaths
Year of birth missing